Anoditica autopa is a moth in the family Xyloryctidae. It was described by Edward Meyrick in 1938. It is found in the former Orientale Province of the Democratic Republic of the Congo.

References

Xyloryctidae
Moths described in 1938
Moths of Africa